John Challinor (5 August 1916 – 1981) was an English footballer who played in the Football League for Stoke City.

Career
Challinor was born in Middlewich and played for Witton Albion before joining Stoke City in 1937. He became a regular in the 1937–38 season due to injury to Charlie Scrimshaw, playing in 34 matches. He managed to make a modest 12 in the following campaign and left for Irish club Linfield. He did well with the Belfast club, and later managed the club for a few years.

Career statistics

References

English footballers
Stoke City F.C. players
Linfield F.C. players
English Football League players
English football managers
Linfield F.C. managers
1916 births
1981 deaths
Witton Albion F.C. players
People from Middlewich
Association football fullbacks